Franzi  is a German television series.

See also
List of German television series

External links
 

2009 German television series debuts
2012 German television series endings
German-language television shows
Television shows set in Bavaria
Das Erste original programming